The Chicago Blasters are an American professional Twenty20 franchise cricket team that compete in Minor League Cricket (MiLC). The team is based in Chicago, Illinois. It was formed in 2020 as part of 24 original teams to compete in Minor League Cricket. The franchise is owned by Iftekhar Shareef, Khurram Syed, and ACAC.

The team's home ground is BPL Cricket Stadium, located in Bolingbrook, Illinois. Local Blasters cricket player Ashhar Medhi helms captaincy duties, while former American cricketer Fahad Babar stands by as vice-captain.

Shaheer Hassan and Najam Iqbal lead the bowling and batting leaderboards with 311 runs and 22 wickets respectively.

Franchise history

Background 
Talks of an American Twenty20 league started in November 2018 just before USA Cricket became the new governing body of cricket in the United States. In May 2021, USA Cricket announced they had accepted a bid by American Cricket Enterprises (ACE) for a US$1 billion investment covering the league and other investments benefitting the U.S. national teams.

In an Annual General Meeting on February 21, 2020, it was announced that USA Cricket was planning to launch Major League Cricket in 2021 and Minor League Cricket that summer, but it was delayed due to the COVID-19 pandemic and due to the lack of high-quality cricket stadiums in the USA. Major League Cricket was pushed to a summer-2023 launch and Minor League Cricket was pushed back to July 31, 2021.

USA Cricket CEO Iain Higgins also pointed out cities such as New York City, Houston and Los Angeles with a large cricket fanbase, and targeted them among others as launch cities for Minor League Cricket.

Exhibition league 
In July 2020, the player registration for the Minor League Cricket exhibition league began. On August 15, 2020, USA Cricket announced the teams participating in the exhibition league matches, also listing the owners for each team. The draft for the exhibition league began on August 22, 2020, with the Chicago Blasters releasing their squad on September 12. Ibrahim Khaleel was later named as captain for the Blasters, with Fahad Babar down for vice-captaincy duties for the exhibition league.

2021 season 

After the conclusion of the exhibition league, USA Cricket announced that they were planning to launch the inaugural season of Minor League Cricket in spring 2021. Ahead of the official season, which was announced to kick off on July 31, the Blasters announced Fahad Babar as captain with Abul Hasan helming vice-captain duties.

Throughout the group stage, the Blasters won against the Athletics once, the Catchers twice, and the Americans once. However, the Blasters lost once against the Strikers, the Grizzlies and the Americans, while losing twice to the Mustangs, the Hurricanes, and the Stars. The Blasters finished 6th in their group, thus not advancing to the play-offs.

2022 season 

Ahead of the 2022 season, Major League Cricket announced that the draft for that season would take place on May 12. Ahead of the official season, it was announced that the captaincy role would be shifted from Khaleel to local Blasters cricketer Ashhar Medhi, with Babar once again given vice-captaincy duties.

Throughout the season, the Blasters lost to the Tigers, Hurricanes, and the Stars twice, and lost to the Blazers, the Blasters, the Grizzlies, the Mustangs, and the Americans once. The Blasters finished last in their group, despite three of their games being washed out.

Current squad 
 Players with international caps are listed in bold.
  denotes a player who is currently unavailable for selection.
  denotes a player who is unavailable for rest of the season

Statistics

Most runs 

Source: CricClubs, Last updated: 1 December 2022

Most wickets 

Source: CricClubs, Last updated: 1 December 2022

See also 
 Major League Cricket
 Minor League Cricket
 2021 Minor League Cricket season
 2021 Minor League Cricket season final
 Minor League Cricket teams

References 

Minor League Cricket teams
Cricket teams in Chicago
Cricket clubs established in 2020
2020 establishments in Illinois